Shahid Salahuddin Cantonment is a cantonment located in Ghatail Upazila, Tangail District, Bangladesh. Ghatail Area Commander is Major General Sayed Tareq Hussain.

Installations
Combined Military Hospital
Military Police Centre and School
Army School of Education and Administration (ASEA)
Station Headquarters, Shaheed Salauddin Cantonment
Medical Corps Centre and School(AMCC&S)
19 Infantry Division
309 Infantry Brigade
19 Artillery Brigade
Area Headquarter, Ghatail Area
7 Horse (Armoured Unit)
Station Supply Depot (SSD), Ghatail
Garrison Engineer (Army), Ghatail Cantonment 
Static Signal Company, Ghatail 
15 Field Ambulance 
Cantonment Board, Shaheed Salauddin Cantonment

References

Cantonments of Bangladesh